Zhang Fengyi (born 1 September 1956) is a Chinese actor best known for his role as "Duan Xiaolou" in Farewell My Concubine (1993), Jing Ke in The Emperor and the Assassin (1998), and Cao Cao in Red Cliff (2008–2009).

Career
Zhang was born in Changsha, Hunan, while his ancestral home was in Tanghe, Henan. When he was merely one month old, he moved with his father to Dongchuan, Yunnan. He left high school in 1971 without completing his studies, and joined the opera troupe of a performing arts group in Dongchuan. He transferred to the singing and dancing team in 1973.

In 1978, Zhang was enrolled in the acting department of the Beijing Film Academy with excellent grades. In 1980, when he was a second year student, he was selected by Hong Kong's Phoenix Studio to play Xin Dalei in Treasure Hunting in Desert (1980), which was his film debut. A year later, Zhang portrayed Xiangzi in Rickshaw Boy, a film directed by Ling Zifeng and adapted from a story by Lao She.

Zhang portrayed Cao Cao in Red Cliff (2008–2009). He also played the protagonist in the film adaptation of White Deer Plain (2011).

In 2014, Zhang starred in the hit historical drama The Empress of China.

Among Zhang's notable projects in recent years is In the Name of the People, a political drama that is based on China's fight against corruption and on other political developments.

Filmography

Film

Television

References

External links
 

1956 births
Living people
Male actors from Changsha
20th-century Chinese male actors
21st-century Chinese male actors
Chinese male stage actors
Chinese male film actors
Chinese male television actors
Chinese male voice actors
Participants in Chinese reality television series